Valeriy Mykhaylovych Asadchev (born 14 July 1953) is a Ukrainian politician and engineering technologist.

Biography
Valeriy Asadchev was born on 14 July 1953 in Kyiv.

External links 
 Valeriy Asadchev at the Official Ukraine Today portal

1953 births
Living people
Politicians from Kyiv
Engineers from Kyiv
People's Movement of Ukraine politicians
Ukrainian People's Party politicians
Governors of Poltava Oblast
Fourth convocation members of the Verkhovna Rada
Third convocation members of the Verkhovna Rada
21st-century Ukrainian engineers